Sterling Wilson Hambrook (January 20, 1935 – July 8, 2017) was a Canadian politician. He served in the Legislative Assembly of New Brunswick from 1974 to 1978, as a Progressive Conservative Party of New Brunswick member for the constituency of Southwest Miramichi.

References

1935 births
2017 deaths
Progressive Conservative Party of New Brunswick MLAs
People from Miramichi, New Brunswick